heli Puya alpestris is a species of bromeliad native to Chilean Andes.  It is native to dry hills, rock outcrops in central and southern Chile at elevations of 0 to 2200 meters. It is one of the most southerly occurring species within the family. Puya alpestris is one of the few Puya species that are grown in some parks and gardens as an ornamental plant.

Description
Puya alpestris grows as a xerophytic, perennial plant. A dense rosette of leaves is formed on a short stem. The tough, stiffly protruding, parallel-veined leaves run into a sharp point, have a length of over 1 meter and a width of 2 to 2.5 centimeters. The leaf margin is reinforced with hooked, curved, spines that are approximately 0.5 cm long. The underside of the leaf is dense white scales.

After many years an upright, loose, paniculate overall inflorescence form, which is composed of numerous racemose partial branching inflorescences. The lower third of the branch contain stellate trichomes. It contains many bright red bracts and many individual flowers. The tips of the partial inflorescences are sterile. The flower stalk is about 7 mm long. The hermaphrodite flower is threefold. The three greenish sepals are about 2.3 cm long and hairy or bald. The three teal petals with blunt tips are about 4.5 cm long and spiral in as they fade. The six stamens have bright orange anthers. The flowers produce a lot of nectar. During the flowering period, one can observe hummingbirds and other birds pollinating the flowers. The plant blooms between October and December in habitat.

Capsule fruits are formed, in each of which many small, airworthy seeds are formed. After the seed and child development, the mother plant slowly dies.

Systematics
This species was first described by Eduard Friedrich Poeppig in 1833 in the Fragmentum Synopseos Plantarum Phanerogamum: 8 under the name Pourretia alpestris. The specific epithet alpestris for "Alps inhabiting" refers to the Andes for this species.  Another synonym is Puya whytei Hook.f. described in Curtis's Botanical Magazine. A subspecies zoellneri was published in Brittonia in 2013. Puya alpestris is a member of Puya subgenus Puya.

Subspecies
A distinction is made between the following subspecies:

References

Steens, A. & Y. Cave. (2003) Bromeliads for the Contemporary Garden. Portland: Timber Press, page 132.

External links
 
 

alpestris
Flora of the Andes
Garden plants of South America
Taxa named by Eduard Friedrich Poeppig